László Orbán (born 23 July 1960) is a Hungarian sports shooter. He competed in the mixed 25 metre rapid fire pistol event at the 1980 Summer Olympics.

References

1960 births
Living people
Hungarian male sport shooters
Olympic shooters of Hungary
Shooters at the 1980 Summer Olympics
Sport shooters from Budapest